Marshall McLuhan's tetrad of media effects uses a tetrad to examine the effects on society of any technology/medium (put another way: a means of explaining the social processes underlying the adoption of a technology/medium) by dividing its effects into four categories and displaying them simultaneously. The tetrad first appeared in print in McLuhan's posthumously-published works Laws of Media (1988) and The Global Village (1989).

The tetrad
The tetrad consists of four questions. 

What does the medium enhance?
What does the medium make obsolete?
What does the medium retrieve that had been obsolesced earlier?
What does the medium reverse or flip into when pushed to extremes?

The laws of the tetrad exist simultaneously, not successively or chronologically, and allow the questioner to explore the "grammar and syntax" of the "language" of media. McLuhan departs from the media theory of Harold Innis in suggesting that a medium "overheats", or reverses into an opposing form, when taken to its extreme.

Visually, a tetrad can be depicted as four diamonds forming an X, with the name of a medium in the center, where the left/right direction reflects the figure/ground association. The two diamonds on the left of a tetrad are the Enhancement and Retrieval qualities of the medium, both Figure qualities. The two diamonds on the right of a tetrad are the Obsolescence and Reversal qualities, both Ground qualities.

 Enhancement (figure): What the medium amplifies or intensifies. For example, radio amplifies news and music via sound.
 Obsolescence (ground): What the medium drives out of prominence. Radio reduces the prominence of print and the visual.
 Retrieval (figure): What the medium recovers which was previously lost. Radio returns the spoken word to the forefront.
 Reversal (ground): What the medium does when pushed to its limits. Acoustic radio flips into audio-visual TV.

See also
Figure and ground (media)
Hot and cool media
Media ecology
Time- and space-bias

Footnotes

Sources
 McLuhan, Marshall, "Laws of the Media," Et cetera, June 1977, pp. 1973-179, with Preface by Paul Levinson. 
 "Laws of Media: The Pentad and Technical Syncretism". Zingrone, Frank. McLuhan Studies 1 (1991).

External links
 "Tetrad - McLuhan - Old Messengers, New Media: The Legacy of Innis and McLuhan - Library and Archives Canada"
 Augmented reality (AR) researcher Helen Papagiannis applies the tetrad to AR at ARE2011 in Silicon Valley.
 The tetrad applied to radio, the press, and the Western on the Ginko Press website.
 Applying the Laws of Media in the software testing field (with a good, clear introduction to the topic in general)  - "McLuhan for Testers"
 "The MediuM: a Marshall McLuhan Board Game" is a gaming experience of Laws of Media. The New Science (1988), tetrad of media effects.

Books about the media
Marshall McLuhan

he:דטרמיניזם טכנולוגי